Emil Winqvist is considered the founder of Scouting and Guiding in Sweden, in 1908.  He was Chief Scout of the YMCA Scout Association from 1911 to 1917.

See also

Scouting in Sweden

References
 https://web.archive.org/web/20071025073817/http://www.scout.se/reportage14334.aspx

Scouting pioneers
Year of birth missing
Year of death missing